Mamdi may refer to:

 Mamdi Department, Chad
 Mamdi, Iraq